Aleksandra "Ola" Kauc-Żelichowska (born 20 February 1980) is a Polish former competitive ice dancer. With Michał Zych, she became a three-time Polish national champion and the 2004 Golden Spin of Zagreb silver medalist. The duo competed in the final segment at three European Championships, three World Championships, and the 2006 Winter Olympics.

Career 
Kauc competed with Michał Przyk and Krzysztof Tomczyk in her early career.

Between 1997 and 2002, she competed with Filip Bernadowski. With him, she was a two-time Polish bronze medalist.

Between 2003 and 2006, she competed with partner Michał Zych. Kauc and Zych were three time Polish national champions. They competed three times at the European Figure Skating Championships and the World Figure Skating Championships. They placed 21st at the 2006 Winter Olympics. After beginning the 2006–2007 season at the 2006 Nebelhorn Trophy, they ended their partnership.

Kauc retired from competitive skating in 2006. She skates professionally. She has appeared on Poland's Dancing on Ice. In the first season, which was in 2007, she was partnered with Zygmunt Chajzer and finished 9th. In the second season, in March 2008, she was partnered with Marek Kościkiewicz and finished 11th.

Programs

With Zych

With Bernadowski

Results

With Zych

With Bernadowski

With Tomczyk

With Przyk

References

External links 
 
 

Polish female ice dancers
Olympic figure skaters of Poland
Figure skaters at the 2006 Winter Olympics
1980 births
Living people
Sportspeople from Łódź
Competitors at the 2001 Winter Universiade